Deer Island may refer to:

In Canada 
 Deer Island, Lake Winnipeg, Manitoba
 Deer Island, Newfoundland and Labrador
 Deer Island (New Brunswick)
 Nunavut:
 Deer Island (Kivalliq Region)
 Qikiqtaarjuk, formerly Deer Island (Qikiqtaaluk Region)
 Arvia'juaq and Qikiqtaarjuk National Historic Site, near Arviat in Nunavut formerly, an island but Qikiqtaarjuk is now part of the mainland
 Igloolik Island#Qikiqtaarjuk, a former island, featured in the film Atanarjuat, that is now a peninsula

In Ireland 
 Deer Island (Ireland)

In the United States 
 Alaska:
 Deer Island (Alaska Panhandle)
 Deer Island (Aleutian Islands)
 Deer Island (Arizona and California)
 Deer Island (Marin County), California
 Deer Isle, Maine
 Deer Island (Massachusetts)
 Deer Island Prison
 Deer Island Waste Water Treatment Plant
 Deer Island (Amesbury, Massachusetts)
 Deer Island (Mississippi)
 Deer Island (Montana), an island in Flathead Lake
 Deer Island (Thousand Islands), New York
 Deer Island, Oregon
 North Deer Island (Texas)

See also
 Deer Island Lake
 Île aux Cerfs ('Deer Isle')
 Cerf Island ("Deer" Island)
 Jura, Scotland